Two Lights is the fourth studio album by American singer Five for Fighting. The first single is titled "The Riddle". The song was released on May 15, 2006, and the album was released on August 1, 2006.

The album peaked at number eight on the Billboard 200 chart, making it Five for Fighting's highest-charting album to date. It has sold over 287,000 copies in the United States as of November 2009.

Track listing

The Best Buy Edition includes two bonus tracks, including
 "The Riddle (acoustic)"
 "Drive You On"

The iTunes Store also released a special edition with two bonus tracks:
 "The Riddle (Acoustic)"
 "Easy Tonight (Acoustic)"

There were also two songs taken out just before release.

 "China on the Horizon"
 "Who Will Save My Life Tonight?"

On May 22, 2020, Five for Fighting announced on Twitter that he released "China on the Horizon" on most major music platforms. It is not known if "Who Will Save My Life Tonight?" will be released in the future.

References

2006 albums
Five for Fighting albums
Aware Records albums